Precision Drilling Corporation  is the largest drilling rig contractor in Canada, also providing oil field rental and supplies.

History

Precision Drilling Ltd. was founded in 1951.

In 1987, Precision Drilling was acquired by Cypress Drilling, led by president Hank Swartout, in a reverse takeover which left the company with a fleet of 19 rigs. Swartout led the company through extensive growth until his retirement in 2007.

In 2005, Precision sold its energy services and international contract-drilling divisions to Weatherford International for $2.28 billion and reorganized as an income trust. Precision converted from an income trust back to a corporation in 2010.

In 2008, Precision acquired its US rival Grey Wolf Inc. for $2 billion, a merger which expanded its rig count in the US, which it had largely left in 2005, over tenfold. The acquisition led to financial difficulties which led to a $330M CAD investment by the Alberta Investment Management Corporation (AIMCo) in 2009, characterized by Maclean's as a bailout. AIMCo divested its stake in 2013.

In 2018, Precision attempted to purchase Trinidad Drilling with over $1B CAD of shares as a white knight, opposing the cash bid of competitor Ensign Energy Services, however a drop in Precision's share price and thus bid value resulted in Ensign's bid prevailing.

In September 2019, amid a difficult energy sector in Alberta, Precision Drilling Corporation's share price fell below the required minimum for the S&P/TSX Composite Index and was removed from the index.

In July 2022, Precision Drilling acquired High Arctic Energy Services Inc.'s welling services and rental divisions for $29.3 million.

Global fleet
In 2019, Precision had 109 land drilling rigs in Canada (21% of the industry total), 104 in the US (5% of total), and 13 among Kuwait, Saudi Arabia, Iraqi Kurdistan, and Georgia.

See also
 List of oilfield service companies

References

External links

Oilfield services companies
Oil companies of Canada
Companies based in Calgary
Non-renewable resource companies established in 1969
1969 establishments in Alberta
2010 Copiapó mining accident
Companies listed on the Toronto Stock Exchange
Companies listed on the New York Stock Exchange